, better known as Saemi Hanagata, is a Japanese professional boxer. She has held the IBF female atomweight title since 2018 and challenged once for the WBC female atomweight title in 2012. As of May 2020, she is ranked as the world's second best active female atomweight by BoxRec.

Professional career
Hanagata made her professional debut on 12 August 2008, losing by unanimous decision (UD) over four rounds against Yu Koshiishi at the Korakuen Hall in Tokyo, Japan. All three judges scored the bout 39–38. 

After compiling a record of 7–2–1 (3 KOs), she challenged WBC female atomweight champion, Momo Koseki, on 17 December 2012 at the Korakuen Hall. Hanagata suffered the third defeat of her career, losing by UD over ten rounds with two judges scoring the bout 96–94 and the third scoring it 98–92.

Three fights later she faced Yuko Kuroki, who she had defeated six months earlier, for the vacant OPBF female minimumweight title on 3 December 2013 at the Korakuen Hall. The bout ended in a split draw over eight rounds, with one judge scoring it 77–76 in favour of Hanagata, another scoring it 77–76 to Kuroki while the third scored it even at 77–77. She captured the vacant OPBF title in her second attempt four months later on 11 March 2014, defeating Satomi Nishimura via fifth-round technical knockout (TKO) at the Korakuen Hall. 

She lost the title by majority decision (MD) in her first defence against Mika Oda in September, before challenging IBF female junior-flyweight champion, Naoko Shibata, on 19 February 2015 at the Korakuen Hall. Hanagata lost by MD in her first attempt at a world title, with two judges scoring the bout 96–95 and 96–94 in favour of Shibata while the third scored it even at 95–95.

After bouncing back from defeat with two wins, one by stoppage, she faced Mika Oda in a rematch for the OPBF title on 1 March 2016 at the Korakuen Hall. Hanagata gained revenge by defeating Oda via fifth-round TKO.

After five more fights–two wins, two draws and a loss–she faced Yuko Kuroki for a third time, with the vacant IBF female atomweight title on the line, on 29 September 2018 at the Korakuen Hall. Hanagata defeated Kuroki via split decision (SD) over ten rounds to capture her first world title. Two judges scored the bout 96–94 in favour of Hanagata while the third scored it 96–95 to Kuroki.

Professional boxing record

References

Living people
1984 births
Japanese women boxers
Sportspeople from Yokohama
Atomweight boxers
Mini-flyweight boxers
Light-flyweight boxers
International Boxing Federation champions